Danniel Ruyange (born 11 September 1985) is a Ugandan cricketer. He plays List A cricket for the Uganda national cricket team.

References

External links
 

1985 births
Living people
Ugandan cricketers
Cricketers from Kampala